Fusarium acremoniopsis is a fungus species of the genus Fusarium.

References

Further reading
 

acremoniopsis
Fungi described in 1915